President Yun may refer to:

 Yun Posun (1897–1990), 2nd president of South Korea
 Yoon Seok-youl (born 1960), 13th president of South Korea

See also
 Yun (Korean surname)